Capella Space is an American space company. It is developing space-based radar Earth observation satellites equipped with synthetic-aperture radar that can penetrate clouds and work at night. The company is based in San Francisco, California. It was founded by Payam Banazadeh, a former engineer at Jet Propulsion Laboratory of NASA, and William Walter Woods. 

The company was founded in 2016, has 150 employees (April 2022), and raised venture capital from investors such as Canaan Partners, Data Collective, Pear VC and Spark Capital.

Capella plans to deploy a fleet of small radar satellites to provide regularly-updated imagery to the U.S. government and commercial customers. Capella is building and launching an initial block of seven "Whitney-class" satellites to provide high-resolution, radar imagery. Sequoia, the first of the group, launched in August 2020. Six more Whitney satellites were launched between January 2021 and January 2022 on SpaceX Transporter rideshare missions into a polar sun-synchronous orbit. After the seven Whitney-class satellites, Capella will assess demand to determine how many more satellites to launch.

Contracts 
In 2019, the National Reconnaissance Office (NRO) awarded Capella a contract to study the integration of Capella's commercial radar imagery with the NRO's government-owned surveillance satellites. The U.S. Air Force awarded Capella a contract in November 2019 to incorporate the company's imagery into the Air Force's virtual reality software. Capella also has a contract with the Navy, and the National Geospatial-Intelligence Agency signed a Cooperative Research and Development Agreement (CRADA), earlier in 2020 to allow researchers from the U.S. government's intelligence community to assist Capella. An inter-satellite link with Inmarsat's network of geostationary communications satellites will enable real-time tasking of Capella's satellites. Customers can use an electronic portal to task a Capella satellite for a radar image. In 2021, Capella received a $3 million research contract in support of the Space Development Agency's National Defense Space Architecture. Capella was chosen through a broad agency announcement.

Satellites

Sequoia satellite 
The Sequoia Earth-imaging satellite was originally supposed to launch as a secondary payload on the Indian rocket Polar Satellite Launch Vehicle (ASLV) in late 2019, but the mission was postponed, prompting Capella to move the satellite to a Falcon 9 rocket of SpaceX, according to Payam Banazadeh. It was booked to fly as a rideshare passenger on the Falcon 9 launch with Argentina's SAOCOM 1B radar observation satellite in late March 2020. But that launch was also delayed at the request of Argentine's space agency (CONAE) as travel and work restrictions were implemented at the onset of the COVID-19 pandemic. That left Capella looking for another ride for Sequoia.

Capella had previously signed a contract with Rocket Lab for a dedicated launch for a future satellite, and Banazadeh said the company decided instead to put Sequoia on the Rocket Lab mission. Rocket Lab encountered delays after an Electron launch failed on 4 July 2020. Meanwhile, SAOCOM 1B launch preparations resumed and the Argentina satellite lifted off earlier on 30 August 2020 at 23:18:00 UTC, hours before the Rocket Lab mission with Sequoia, on 31 August 2020 at 03:05:47 UTC. The Electron launcher delivered Sequoia to a 525 km orbit, inclined 45.0°. Sequoia has a launch weight of 100 kg.

Whitney satellites 

Six Whitney satellites were originally planned. The first two (Capella-3 and Capella-4) were launched on the Falcon 9 Transporter-1 rideshare mission to a Sun-synchronous orbit on 24 January 2021. 

Capella-6 (Whitney-4) was launched as a rideshare on Starlink V1.0 L26 on 15 May 2021. 

Capella-5 (Whitney-3) was launched as a rideshare on the mission Transporter-2 on 30 June 2021.

Capella-7 and Capella-8 were launched as a rideshare on the mission Transporter-3 on 13 January 2022.

Capella-9 (Whitney-7) and Capella-10 (Whitney-8), two additional satellites in this series, to be launched no earlier than 10 January 2023.

See also 

 Earth observation satellite
 COSMO-SkyMed
 ICEYE
 Planet Labs
 TerraSAR-X

References

External links 
 Capella Space website

Companies based in Palo Alto, California
Aerospace companies of the United States
Spacecraft manufacturers
Manufacturing companies established in 2015
Technology companies established in 2015
2015 establishments in California